The Complete "Is" Sessions is a 2002 Blue Note Records compilation / re-issue album by Chick Corea of material recorded in May 1969. The material of the "Is" sessions was released originally on two separate albums on two different record labels. The songs "Is", "This", "Jamala" and "It" were issued as Is on Solid State Records in 1969, whilst the remaining songs were released as Sundance on the Groove Merchant label in 1972.  The 2002 Blue Note double CD package also includes alternate takes from the original recording sessions.

Track listing
All tracks composed by Chick Corea unless otherwise noted.

Disc one
 "It" – 0:30
 "The Brain" – 10:10
 "This" – 8:18
 "Song of the Wind" – 8:05
 "Sundance" – 10:02
 "The Brain [alternate take]" – 7:26
 "This [alternate take]" – 11:49
 "Song of the Wind [alternate take]" – 6:46
 "Sundance [alternate take]" – 12:28

Disc two
 "Jamala" (Dave Holland) – 14:07
 "Converge" – 7:59
 "Is" – 28:54
 "Jamala [alternate take]" (Holland) – 8:57
 "Converge [alternate take]" – 7:59

Personnel
 Chick Corea – piano, electric piano
 Woody Shaw – trumpet
 Hubert Laws – flute, piccolo flute
 Bennie Maupin – tenor sax
 Dave Holland – bass
 Jack DeJohnette – drums
 Horace Arnold – drums, percussion

Production
 Malcolm Addey – engineer, mastering
 Michael Cuscuna – liner notes, release production
 Sonny Lester – producer
 Patrick Roques – artwork
 Francis Wolff – artwork, photography

References

External links
 
 Chick Corea - The Complete "Is" Sessions (rec. 1969, rel. 2002) album review by Thom Jurek, credits & releases at AllMusic
 Chick Corea - The Complete "Is" Sessions (rec. 1969, rel. 2002) album releases & credits at Discogs

2002 compilation albums
Chick Corea albums
Blue Note Records albums
Albums produced by Sonny Lester